is a Japanese shōjo manga series written and illustrated by Keiko Suenobu. Life was serialiized in Kodansha's shōjo manga magazine Bessatsu Friend. In 2006, it won the Kodansha Manga Award for shōjo. 

A live-action drama series, produced by Fuji TV aired in Japan from June 30 to September 15, 2007. A single-volume drama novelization was also created. Like the manga, it was published by Bessatsu Friend and written by Keiko Suenobu; unlike the manga, however, it saw a limited run and is now out of print.

Characters

Played by: Kie Kitano
A high school student (First Year, Class 2). She studies at Nishidate High School, or Nishikō ('Nishi High'), who consistently struggles on tests despite being very intelligent. She lives with her single middle-class mother and younger sister, Akane, in a company house but her father is never present (in the television drama, Ayumu has a younger brother named Makoto, their mother's name is Fumiko and her father "is always out of town on business trips"); her family doesn't pay much attention to her until Volume 19 of the manga, when she's hospitalized due to the stabbing incident. After the end of her friendship with Shii-chan at the very end of middle school, she has difficulties fitting into high school life and resorts to self-harm in order to cope and relieve stress – in Volume 5 of the manga, she has 19 cuts. Manami is her first friend at Nishikō (it appears that she's afraid of Manami because Manami gets angry with her when she talks to other girls in the class) but their friendship doesn't last long (until Volume 4) - Manami and her group start to bully her because they think she is trying to steal Katsumi from Manami. When Ayumu tells the truth about Katsumi's real self as well as Manami's bullying and involvement with Akira, no one believes her except Miki and Yūki. Despite many hardships, including Manami's bullying, Katsumi's stalking and molestation, Akira's abusive behaviors, and the teachers' and family's passiveness, her friendship with Miki and Yūki's support give her the strength she needs to stand up for herself, to stop self-harming, and to become a stronger and more confident person. In Volume 15 of the manga, the truth finally comes out but she's not satisfied until she understands Manami's feelings and thoughts as well as Manami's wish to live on, although they cause Ayumu to get stabbed by Manami and, thus, hospitalized. After shortly meeting with Manami, she reports all Manami's bad deeds to the police and continues to live on.

Played by: Megumi Seki
A girl in Ayumu's class at Nishikō, later also Ayumu's friend. Strikingly beautiful and independent, she is usually the top student of her school, and has a quiet willpower and strength. She can relate to what Ayumu is going through - she is also a victim of Manami and her group but, unlike Ayumu, she does not let it bother her, at least outwardly. She has been known to work multiple jobs, such as working behind the counter at the risqué Rainbow Café and being a bunny girl at clubs (in the TV drama, she only works at Rainbow Café, and her being a bunny girl is only hinted at), therefore, most of the time she's not at school. Like most of her classmates, Miki is about fifteen or sixteen, but she stretches the truth when trying to find work, saying instead that she is nineteen. She lives with her father, Tsurayuku, but most of the time he's hospitalized due to his heart disease; after her parents' divorce, she never sees her mother. At the age of 6, she lived with her grandfather, a cabinet maker, and his apprentices but then she moved out with her father - it's revealed in Volume 12 of the manga, when the girls go to visit Miki's grandfather for the summer vacation. She is always a good friend to Ayumu by helping her out, comforting her, and cheering her up (she's one of the few students who doesn't bully Ayumu); Ayumu is the first one to ask her to be friends. In Volume 15 of the manga, Ms. Toda frames Miki in cheating during exams (as part of Manami's request) but no one in the class believes that (this causes the truth about Manami to come out) and she's not punished. In Volume 19 of the manga, while visiting Ayumu in the hospital, her father's doctor suggests Miki to leave because her father needs to get a surgery so she decides to move and transfer school. Before leaving, she spends a great day with Ayumu and Yūki.

Played by: Takahiro Hōjō
A guy in Ayumu's class at Nishikō, later also Ayumu's and Miki's friend. He first appears in Volume 6 of the manga after bumping into Ayumu, where he immediately notices she is distressed. When Manami and her group are trying to take Ayumu into the bathroom (likely to torment her), Yūki along with other guys from the same class stops them and tells them off. He reveals to her his own bullying experiences in Tatsuki Middle School, including being stripped and beaten by his classmates, events which lead him to stand up for Ayumu, though he insists that he is trying to erase his own pain not because of her sake. Afterwards, he's always helping Ayumu out when in trouble. In Volume 7 of the manga, it's revealed that Akira was his main tormentor and Yūki transferred school to avoid the bully. Despite his past experiences, he overall has a gentle and kind nature.

Played by: Saki Fukuda
Ayumu's first friend, later ex-friend, at Nishikō. She's extremely manipulative and spoiled; as the daughter of a rich CEO (and possible future mayor), she uses her powers, charisma and conceit to force others to do her will, also by blackmail, threats or sexual favors. Her manipulations allow her to use emotions as a weapon; she appears the "innocent good girl" (in front of teachers, her parents, or other people of authority), the martyr (when her bullying draws the attention of other classmates and teachers), or the predator (when tormenting others). People tend to take her side because of how she conducts herself in confrontational situations. She is obsessed with her boyfriend Katsumi (during their first break-up she becomes suicidal but Ayumu saves her) - it's revealed that she was bullied in middle school when dating Katsumi, nevertheless, she likes to bully anyone who deserves it, betrays her or stands up to her. At first, she and her group, including Ayumu, bullies Miki because she is into "some pretty bad stuff". However, she later turns all classmates (except Miki and Yūki) against Ayumu for a misunderstanding, in which Katsumi breaks up with her and starts to pursue Ayumu, although he tells Manami that "Ayumu is pursuing him". After an incident where Ayumu destroys Katsumi's cellphone, Manami gets angry with Katsumi because she thinks he's defending Ayumu, but they soon make up. She uses Akira to do all her dirty work, e.g. getting revenge on Katsumi (she feels betrayed because he wants to break up with her) and Ayumu. She also lies to her parents that she's being bullied by Ayumu and Miki causing her father to show up at school and forces Hiro to tell the school that Hiro is the bully (so Manami won't bully Hiro anymore for almost telling the truth to Ayumu). Since Hirose's attempted suicide, all her classmates thinks (but speaks out only in Volume 15 of the manga) that she's the culprit of everything (Ayumu's bullying, Hirose's attempted suicide and lie, Ms. Hiraoka's transfer, and Miki's cheat sheet), thus, they start to ignore her. All her bad deeds, including her true colors, are then known to the whole school so she escapes to Katsumi's home, thinking him as her only ally. Here, Manami explains Ayumu the truth behind their friendship (she approached Ayumu because Ayumu wasn't ugly and should have been her follower without questioning or opposing her), her involvement with the hospital incident and her intentions of killing Ayumu with a knife (she hates Ayumu because Ayumu opposes her, thus, she can't let her live happily) but she stops when she discovers Katsumi's scrapbook. After hearing the truth from Katsumi, she stabs him in the back and she then stabs herself in the stomach. Before giving herself a mortal wound, Ayumu stops her; living is her punishment to redeem herself. In the hospital, Manami reveals her father her true real self and seeks Ayumu out because she wants to be reported to the police. In the end, she's in a reformatory.

Played by: Yoshihiko Hosoda
Manami's boyfriend. Around large groups of people he acts as a polite and sweet student with good grades; but his real self is manipulative and abusive. He has a fetish for bondage and keeps a scrapbook of the girls he turns into his slaves. This scrapbook is casually discovered by Ayumu, when she tries to convince him to get back together with Manami during their first break up. As a result of that, he wants to forcefully make her his slave, so he molests her, blackmails her (about her self-harm secret and nude photos]] taken with his cellphone), stalks her, and even completely tricks Ayumu's mother into thinking he is a nice person when hired as Ayumu's tutor. Early in the series, it's revealed that he did not enter Nishikō of his own free will – his father had made him enroll because Manami, who was good for the reputation of the Sako name, would be a student there; the relationship he and Manami began at Tatsuki Middle School have been caused by their fathers. Because of this, Katsumi breaks up with Manami but soon his father forces him to end his "relationship" with Ayumu and get back together with Manami for business purposes. While they get back together, Katsumi becomes a target of Akira who is following Manami's request (in the drama, he's explicitly going out with Ms. Toda). At first, he's beaten and robbed by Akira but later Akira extorts money from him, otherwise he'd divulge his secret about forcefully dating Manami. He starts dating Ms. Toda but are seen by Manami's group, thus, Manami breaks up with him. After Ms. Toda's resignation and Manami's exposed true colors, he accidentally sets the fire alarm off so everyone, including Manami, thinks he wants to help her. At home, he sees Manami and Ayumu who discover his scrapbook so he finally tells Manami the truth about his fetish and his feelings (he never liked her). As a consequence, he is stabbed in the back by Manami and runs from the house. In the hospital, his father gets angry at Katsumi after learning the truth about his fetish and the end of his relationship with Manami which causes him to be "out of business" but, at the same time, Katsumi gets angry with him because he thinks of being only a tool for his father. In the end, Katsumi is last seen in the bedroom crying and holding a picture of his classmates.

Played by: Asaka Seto
Ayumu's homeroom teacher at Nishikō. She has a "peace at any price" principle, leading her to deny Ayumu's declaration of teasing by passing it off as "Ayumu's fault" (Volume 6 of the manga). She is shown as very sympathetic towards Katsumi and Manami. During summer vacation, Ms. Toda starts dating Katsumi and is seen kissing him on a beach by Manami's group. When she's found out by Manami, she promises Manami to help her to get rid of Miki in exchange of her silence. Her actions, however, backfire and Manami blackmails her with the beach photo but Ms. Toda decides to speak the truth. As a result of that, she is forced to resign but teaches somewhere else. In the drama, she dates Katsumi; to keep anyone else from finding out (save for Manami, who had already figured it out), she frames Ayumu by blaming her for all the bullying that goes on at Nishikō, even though they "both" know full well that Ayumu is the victim, rather than the one behind it.

Played by: Miki Sakai
Assistant teacher of Ayumu's class at Nishikō. She's the only non-corrupt teacher who seeks the truth about all this bullying situation because she doesn't believe that Hirose is the culprit. After questioning around, she finds out that Manami's guilty. She is forcefully transferred to Yugen High School, an all boys' school, thanks to Manami's father. She's sorry that she couldn't help Ayumu. In the end, she's a fine and strict teacher at Yugenkō.

Played by: Tomoya Nakamura
Student at Asakuma High School (it appears that this school doesn't have a good reputation). He first appears in Volume 5 of the manga - while hanging out with Miki, Ayumu falls over a beer bottle belonging to someone from Akira's group so Miki wants to revenge her friend and smashes it right where they are sitting; because of Miki's actions, they want revenge so they unsuccessfully rape them in a karaoke booth. He is depicted as a delinquent who is in love with Manami. In exchange of sex, Akira does whatever Manami asks him regarding Katsumi (as in assaulting, robbing, extorting money from and blackmailing him) but also Ayumu and Miki (as in kidnapping as well as almost raping]] and killing them). After the incident at the abandoned hospital (Ayumu and Miki were kidnapped by Akira and his group but Yūki saved them after winning a fight with Akira who fell from a window), Akira tells Manami that he'll stay quiet and wait for her before running away but she soon reports him to the police and is taken into custody.
Manami's group:
Girls in Ayumu's class at Nishikō. Their names are revealed only in Volume 9: Hirose (or Hiro-chan), Emi, Chika and Iwamoto (or Iwa-chan). They go in the same class as Manami, Ayumu, Miki and Yūki, and are Manami's friends. They are so manipulated by Manami's behavior and actions that they believe whatever Manami says, therefore, they'll do whatever it takes to protect Manami, e.g. bullying Miki or Ayumu. However, Hiro discovers Manami's plot against Katsumi and Ayumu (Volume 9 of the manga) but ends in hospital for attempted suicide and is forced to lie that she's the culprit of the bullying situation in exchange of being forgiven by Manami; due to this reason she's expelled (until Volume 20 of the manga). After Hiro's attempted suicide, Iwa gets scared so she decides to distance herself from Manami (Volume 12 of the manga) and transfer school to Kyushu. Emi and Chika also start to see Manami's true colors but they speak out only after the incident with Miki's cheat sheet, thus, they start to ignore Manami. After the stabbing incident, Emi is the only one who is brave enough to explain to the teachers and Manami's father about the whole bullying situation because she wants to redeem herself.

Played by: Akane Osawa
Ayumu's ex-best friend from Saku Radani Middle School. Her surname is Shinozuka, which is why Ayumu calls her Shii-chan (her given name is never mentioned in the manga; it is Yūko in the TV drama). She had promised Ayumu that even if they went to different high schools, they'd still be friends. At the top of her class, she dreamed of getting into Nishidate to be like a girl who used to live next door to her. However, her grades began to slip due to tutoring Ayumu instead of focusing on her own schoolwork. Eventually Ayumu began scoring higher on her final exams, but lied about it in order to make Shii-chan feel better. Her dreams are shattered when the entrance exam results are posted and her grades are too low to make it into Nishidate. When she discovers the truth, she blames Ayumu and angrily breaks off their friendship despite the promise she had made. It is her broken friendship with Shii-chan that drives Ayumu to begin cutting.

Media

Manga
Written and illustrated by Keiko Suenobu, Life was serialized in Kodansha's shōjo manga magazine from 2002 to 2009. It was released in twenty tankōbon volumes.

The English-language version of the manga, published by Tokyopop, was originally rated OT (Older Teen; 16+), but starting with the release of Volume 6 and carrying back over to future reprintings of the previous five, the rating was changed to M (Mature; 18+) for extremely explicit content in that volume. As of June 2008, nine volumes have been released in the United States; Volume 10 was scheduled for a September 2008 release, but on August 31, 2009, Kodansha (original Japanese publisher of the series) announced that they would drop their manga licensing contract with Tokyopop, leaving Life unfinished until 2023, when Kodansha USA announced that they have licensed the series.

Suenobu created a sequel to the manga, titled Life 2: Giver/Taker, which started serialization in the seinen manga magazine Monthly Afternoon on June 25, 2016. In 2023, Kodansha USA announced that they also licensed the sequel manga.

Television drama
Fuji TV began airing a television drama based on the Life manga on June 30, 2007 at 11:10 PM (replacing Liar Game). The eleventh and final episode aired on September 15. The protagonist, Ayumu, was played by Kie Kitano. Popular singer Mika Nakashima performed the theme song, also titled "Life", which was sold as a single starting August 22 (mobile downloads began at the end of July). The actual soundtrack is now available in Japan, as is a full-series DVD boxed set; the latter was released on December 19. The plotline for the drama is much more focused on bullying than is the original manga, and many changes were made, ranging from mild and hardly noteworthy to significant and highly noticeable.

Differences from the manga
Ayumu does not cut her arms in the drama.
Ayumu's family situation in the drama differs greatly from the manga: she has a little brother, Makoto, instead of her little sister, Akane; their mother, unnamed in the manga, is named Fumiko; and their father, whom "Fumiko" appears to be divorced from in the manga, is simply "always away on business" (according to Ayumu) in the drama.
Shii-chan's first name is Yūko—it is unknown in the manga.
Right after breaking off her friendship with Ayumu, Shii-chan attempts suicide by running out in traffic and survives; Ayumu goes to visit her in the hospital with flowers but Shii-chan closes the door when she sees her. She is not seen again until Episode 10.
Katsumi went to the same cram school as Shii-chan; in the second episode, as a way to watch Ayumu squirm, he whispers Shii-chan's name in her ear ("Shinozuka... Yūko"), causing her to struggle harder to escape his machinations. In the drama this is supposedly used to replace the scene in the manga where Katsumi blackmails Ayumu after discovering that she cuts herself.
Hatori is a lot less wild than her manga counterpart. In the live action, she does not smoke, drink, or pull pranks.
One member of Manami's squadron, Nodoka Hirose (廣瀬 和華 Hirose Nodoka), (known as Noriko Hirose (廣瀬 倫子 Hirose Noriko)), has a slightly different role than that of her manga counterpart - throughout the drama, she alternates between being Manami's target and a member of her group. "Hiro" (as she is known by her classmates in the drama) is portrayed by Nanase Hoshii.

References

Further reading

External links
 Life on Tokyopop's official site
 Life on Betsufure's official site 
 TV drama Life on Fuji TV's official site 
 Life on Norma Editorial's official site

2002 manga
2007 Japanese television series debuts
2007 Japanese television series endings
Fuji TV dramas
Japanese television dramas based on manga
Kodansha manga
Seinen manga
Self-harm in fiction
Shōjo manga
Tokyopop titles
Winner of Kodansha Manga Award (Shōjo)